Jillian Roberts is a prominent Canadian child psychologist, author and faculty member at the University of Victoria. Roberts works and writes in both English and French.

Born and raised in British Columbia, Roberts obtained degrees from the University of Waterloo (1991), Dalhousie University (1992), the University of Toronto (1995), and the University of Calgary (1998). Her doctoral work was about children with HIV/AIDS and her HIV research continues to be featured by the Canadian Foundation for AIDS Research (CANFAR). In 1999, she assumed a faculty position in educational psychology at the University of Victoria.

Roberts' Just Enough series of children's books was released in 2016. She followed this with the series World Around Us. The first book On Our Streets: Our First Talk About Poverty was co-written with Google's Jaime Casap and a finalist for the 2018 Bolen Books Children's Book Prize, given by the Victoria Book Prize Society. The final book of the series, On Our Nature Walk: Our First Talk About Our Impact on the Environment (2020) was forwarded by the CBC's Bob McDonald. The World Around Us series is featured in Scholastic Canada's Classroom Essentials. In 2022, Roberts published "Calm" and "My Promise" for the youngest of readers.

In her capacity as a child psychologist, Roberts has been quoted in HuffPost, CBC News, Slate and Psychology Today. In 2020, she was awarded the University of Toronto at OISE's Leaders and Legends Award for Distinguished Service. In 2021, she was awarded a City of Victoria Honorary Citizen Award. She was awarded the University of Waterloo's 2022 Arts Alumni Achievement Award for having made "leaps and bounds in making a social impact and assisting the whole of Canada to become more aware about the mental wellness needs of our children and the youth." In 2022, she began writing regular parenting articles for Today's Parent. In 2023, the mental health clinics that were founded under her name were rebranded as MindKey Health.

References

Living people
Child psychologists
Academic staff of the University of Victoria
Canadian social sciences writers
Canadian children's writers
Canadian women non-fiction writers
HIV/AIDS researchers
Writers from British Columbia
University of Waterloo alumni
Dalhousie University alumni
University of Toronto alumni
University of Calgary alumni
Year of birth missing (living people)